The Village Store (also known as the Oxford Place) is a historic site in Jacksonville, Florida. It is located at 4216, 4212, and 4208 Oxford Avenue, and 2906 and 2902 Corinthian Avenue. On September 29, 1988, it was added to the U.S. National Register of Historic Places.

References

External links

 Duval County listings at National Register of Historic Places
 Florida's Office of Cultural and Historical Programs
 Duval County listings
 Village Store

Buildings and structures in Jacksonville, Florida
History of Jacksonville, Florida
National Register of Historic Places in Jacksonville, Florida